Wake the Sleeper is the 21st studio album by the rock band Uriah Heep, released on 2 June 2008 in Europe and on 26 August 2008 in the United States. The announced September 2007 release was rescheduled (initially to March 2008) as a result of the purchase of Sanctuary Records by Universal Music. This was to allow proper promotion of the album, rather than it be 'lost' during the changeover and, although frustrating for them, was something the band members supported. It is their first studio album since 1998's Sonic Origami. It is also their first album since 1980's Conquest without long-time drummer Lee Kerslake, who had to withdraw from the band due to ill health in 2007, putting an end to the band's longest-lasting lineup which existed for 21 years.

Background 
This album was also be released as a 12" vinyl album in a gatefold sleeve.

The song "What Kind of God" was inspired by the book Bury My Heart at Wounded Knee by Dee Brown (1970), which refers to the Wounded Knee Massacre.

Wake the Sleeper was nominated by the British magazine Classic Rock as the Album of the Year.

Track listing
All songs written by Mick Box and Phil Lanzon, except where noted.

Personnel 
Uriah Heep
 Mick Box – guitars, backing vocals
 Trevor Bolder – bass, backing vocals
 Phil Lanzon – keyboards, backing vocals
 Bernie Shaw – lead vocals
 Russell Gilbrook – drums, backing vocals

Production
 Mike Paxman – producer
 Mark Evans – mixing
 Denis Blackham – mastering

Charts

Certifications

References

2008 albums
Uriah Heep (band) albums
Sanctuary Records albums
Albums produced by Mike Paxman